Armani is an Italian luxury fashion company founded by Giorgio Armani in 1975.

Armani may also refer to:

Places
Armani (ancient kingdom), an ancient kingdom centered in Aleppo, Syria
Armani Bolaghi, a village in West Azerbaijan Province, Iran
Armani Jan, a village in Kermanshah Province, Iran
Armani Mahalleh, a village in Gilan Province, Iran
Tall Armani, a village in Isfahan Province, Iran

Other uses
Armani (name)

See also

Al-Armani, a surname meaning Armenian or from the region of Armenia